Anthony Russell Vasquez (born September 19, 1986) is an American professional baseball pitcher who is a free agent. He has played in Major League Baseball (MLB) for the Seattle Mariners.

Career
Vasquez attended Ronald Reagan High School in San Antonio, Texas, Texas A&M University, and the University of Southern California (USC). He played college baseball for the Texas A&M Aggies and the USC Trojans.

Seattle Mariners
The Seattle Mariners selected Vasquez in the 18th round of the 2009 MLB draft. He made his professional debut with the rookie ball Pulaski Mariners. He spent the 2010 season playing for three Mariners affiliates, the Single-A Clinton LumberKings, the High-A High Desert Mavericks, and the Double-A West Tenn Diamond Jaxx, recording a cumulative 11–9 record and 2.46 ERA in 28 games for the clubs. He made his MLB debut on August 23, 2011. He recorded his first  MLB strikeout against the second batter he faced. On November 3, 2011, Vasquez was outrighted off of the 40-man roster after struggling to a 8.90 ERA in 29.1 innings for the Mariners. Vasquez spent the 2012 season in Triple-A with the Tacoma Rainiers, pitching to a 6.53 ERA and 6–5 record. He split the 2013 season between the Double-A Jackson Generals and Clinton, accumulating a 2–6 record and 4.08 ERA in 15 appearances. On March 27, 2014, Vasquez was released by the Mariners.

Baltimore Orioles
Vasquez signed a minor league deal with the Baltimore Orioles on April 8, 2014. He split the season between the Triple-A Norfolk Tides and the Double-A Bowie Baysox, pitching to an 8–8 record and 4.95 ERA before electing free agency after the season on November 4, 2014. V

Philadelphia Phillies
Vasquez signed a minor league deal with the Philadelphia Phillies on February 3, 2015. He split the year between the Triple-A Lehigh Valley IronPigs and the Double-A Reading Fightin Phils, recording a 9–8 record and 4.10 ERA. He elected free agency after the season and re-signed with the Phillies on January 12, 2016. In 2016 with Lehigh Valley and Reading, Vasquez pitched to a 12–4 record and 3.08 ERA. He elected free agency on November 7, 2016.

Detroit Tigers
On January 10, 2017, Vasquez signed a minor-league contract with the Detroit Tigers. He elected free agency on November 6, 2017.

Arizona Diamondbacks
On February 23, 2018, Vasquez signed a minor league deal with the Arizona Diamondbacks. He was released by the organization on August 2, 2018.

Sultanes de Monterrey
On August 7, 2018, Vasquez signed with the Sultanes de Monterrey of the Mexican League. On January 16, 2019, Vasquez signed a minor league deal with the Diamondbacks. He was released on July 25, 2019.

On July 30, 2019, Vasquez again signed with the Sultanes de Monterrey of the Mexican League.
After the 2019 season, he played for Tomateros de Culiacán of the Mexican Pacific League(LVMP). He has also played for Mexico in the 2020 Caribbean Series.

Vasquez did not play any LMB games in 2020 due to cancellation of the LMB season during the COVID-19 pandemic. In July 2020, Vasquez signed on to play for the Eastern Reyes del Tigre of the Constellation Energy League (a makeshift four-team independent league created as a result of the COVID-19 pandemic) for the 2020 season. He was subsequently named to the league's all-star team. After the 2020 season, Vasquez played for Tomateros of the LVMP. He has also played for Mexico in the 2021 Caribbean Series.

Mariachis de Guadalajara
On May 20, 2021, Vasquez signed with the Mariachis de Guadalajara of the Mexican League. He was released on September 23, 2022.

Scouting report

Personal life
Vasquez's father, Rudy, works as a scout for the Los Angeles Angels of Anaheim. In November 2012, Vasquez underwent surgery to repair a cerebral arteriovenous malformation after a blood vessel in his brain ruptured. His relative, Chris Beene, is a major influence in his life.

References

External links

1986 births
Living people
American expatriate baseball players in Mexico
Baseball players from San Antonio
Bowie Baysox players
Cardenales de Lara players
American expatriate baseball players in Venezuela
Clinton LumberKings players
Erie SeaWolves players
High Desert Mavericks players
Jackson Generals (Southern League) players
Lehigh Valley IronPigs players
Major League Baseball pitchers
Mariachis de Guadalajara players
Mexican League baseball pitchers
Norfolk Tides players
Pulaski Mariners players
Reading Fightin Phils players
Reno Aces players
Seattle Mariners players
Sultanes de Monterrey players
Tacoma Rainiers players
Texas A&M Aggies baseball players
Toledo Mud Hens players
Tomateros de Culiacán players
United States national baseball team players
USC Trojans baseball players
Venados de Mazatlán players
West Tennessee Diamond Jaxx players
2015 WBSC Premier12 players
Eastern Reyes del Tigre players